Innaba was a Palestinian village in the Ramle Subdistrict of Mandatory Palestine. It was depopulated during the 1948 Arab–Israeli War on July 10, 1948 by the Yiftach and Eighth Brigades of Operation Dani. It was located 7 km east of Ramla.

History
The Romans referred to the village as "Betoannaba", and ceramics from the Byzantine era have been found here.

Al-Muqaddasi  (c. 945/946 - 991), in his description of Ramla, noted that it had a gate called "The gate of the Innaba Mosque".

Ottoman era
Innaba, like the rest of   Palestine, was incorporated into the Ottoman Empire in 1517, and in the tax records of 1596 it was a village in the nahiya ("subdistrict") of Ramla, part  of Gaza Sanjak, with a population of 30 households; an estimated 165 people, all Muslims. The villagers paid a fixed tax rate of 25%  on agricultural products, which included wheat, barley, summer crops, olive trees, sesame, vineyards, fruit trees, goats and beehives, in addition to occasional revenues; a total of 4,200 akçe. All of the revenues went to a waqf.

In 1838, it was noted as a Muslim  village,  'Anabeh,   in the  District of Lydda.

In 1863, Victor Guérin found that it had 900 inhabitants, while an Ottoman village list from about 1870 noted it as having a population of 250, in 79 houses, though the population count included men, only.

In 1883, the PEF's Survey of Western Palestine described it as  "A village of moderate size, on high ground, surrounded with olives, with a well to the south. The houses are of mud. It is mentioned by Jerome [.. ] as 4 Roman miles east of Lydda, and as called Betho Annaba. The distance fits almost exactly."

British Mandate era 
In the 1922 census of Palestine, conducted by the British Mandate authorities, Ennabeh had a population of 863;  862 Muslims, and one Orthodox Christian.  In the 1931 census  Innaba was counted with Al-Kunayyisa, together they had 1135 Muslim inhabitants, in 288 houses.
An elementary school for boys was founded in 1920 and in 1945, it had an enrollment of 168 students. Innaba also had a mosque, which was dedicated to al-Shaykh 'Abd Allah and had a shrine for him.

In the  1945 statistics  it had population of 1,420 Muslims,  while the total land area was 12,857 dunams, according to an official land and population survey.  Of this, a total of 111 dunams were uses for citrus and bananas, 511 were plantations and irrigable land, 10,626 were used for cereals,  while 54 dunams were classified as built-up public areas.

1948, aftermath
The village was depopulated on July 10, 1948, after a military assault by the Israeli army.  On the same day, Operation Danny head quarter ordered the Yiftach Brigade to blow up most of Innaba and Al-Tira, leaving only houses enough for a small garrison.

The Israeli settlement of Kefar Shemu'el was established on Innaba land in 1950.

Innaba was described in 1992: "The site, which overlooks the Jerusalem-Tel Aviv highway a few km from al-Latrun and its abbey, is fenced off and is difficult to enter. It is covered with heaps of rubble and overgrown with vegetation, including cactuses and stunted olive and Christ's-thorn trees from the pre-1948 period. In addition to the rubble of houses, the debris from the school and the local headquarters of the  Arab Palestine Party  are visible. In the cemetery, the tombs of Hasan Badwan and Ayish Badwan are prominent because of their stone super structures. A Christ's-thorn tree rises amidst the rubble of the former house of Muhammad Tummalay, and a denuded mulberry tree stands amid the rubble of Muhammad 'Abd Allah's house. The surrounding land is cultivated but remnants of the old agriculture remain, such as the groves of 'Ali al-Kasji, with their olive and pomegranate trees and cactus clusters, and the olive trees on the land of Abu Rummana. A deserted well with a heap of stones around its mouth lies in the section of the village formerly referred to as al-'Attan."

References

Bibliography

External links
Welcome To 'Innaba
Innaba, Zochrot
Survey of Western Palestine, Map 17: IAA, Wikimedia commons 
'Innaba from the Khalil Sakakini Cultural Center

Arab villages depopulated during the 1948 Arab–Israeli War
District of Ramla